The Yorkshire Wildlife Trust is a charitable non-governmental organisation, one of the UK's 46 county-based Wildlife Trusts. It's focus is nature conservation and it works to achieve a nature-rich Yorkshire with healthy and resilient ecosystems that support both Yorkshire's wildlife and its people. 

It works across the ceremonial county's of East, North, South, and West Yorkshire; with the exception of the Sheffield District and some of Rotherham District, where the separate Sheffield and Rotherham Wildlife Trust operates, and the Unitary Authorities of Middlesbrough, Redcar and Cleveland, and Stockton-on-Tees, where the separate Tees Valley Wildlife Trust operates. 

The second oldest Wildlife Trust, having been originally formed as the Yorkshire Naturalists Trust in 1946, it is now one of the largest Wildlife Trusts with an income of over £13 million, and over 150 staff. The Trust is a membership organisation and has grown to become one of the largest civil society organisations in Yorkshire, with over 50,000 members spread across the county. 

Although originally founded to manage nature reserves; much of the Trust's impact is now achieved by collaborating with and supporting other land owners and land managers to contribute to the recovery of Yorkshire's nature. Of particular note, the Trust is recognised as a world leader in peatland restoration. Having supported land owners to restore over 30,000 hectares of peat across the county since the mid-2000s. The Trust also has a marine conservation programme, with a particular focus on seagrass and oyster restoration in the Humber Estuary. 

The Trust also runs an extensive outreach and engagement programme, enabling thousands of children and adults to learn more about both the wonder and the benefits of nature and healthy ecosystems.

Nature Reserves
The Trust was originally created to protect the Trust's first nature reserve, Askham Bog. It now manages over 3,000 hectares of land across over 100 nature reserves. Its most famous and well-visited reserves include Spurn Point, Potteric Carr, Wheldrake Ings, parts of Flamborough Head, and parts of Ingleborough. Many of Yorkshire's, and in some cases England's (SSSIs) and Europe's (Natura 2000) most important sites for biodiversity are now Yorkshire Wildlife Trust Reserves. Most, but not all, of the Trust's reserves have some form of public access, although visitors are encouraged to respect the nature the reserves are there to protect. In particular by avoiding taking dogs on reserves, except reserves where this is explicitly allowed, and only then dogs must be kept on a short lead at all times.

North Yorkshire

East Yorkshire

South Yorkshire

West Yorkshire

References

External links
Yorkshire Wildlife Trust website
 Yorkshire Wildlife Trust Archive at the Borthwick Institute for Archives

Organisations based in York
Wildlife Trusts of England
Organizations established in 1946
1946 establishments in England